The Bonn–Paris conventions were signed in May 1952 and came into force after the 1955 ratification. The conventions put an end to the Allied occupation of West Germany.

The delay between the signing and the ratification was due to the French failure to ratify the related treaty on the European Defense Community. This was eventually overcome by the British Foreign Secretary Anthony Eden proposing that West Germany become a member of NATO and the removal of the references to the European Defense Community in the Bonn–Paris conventions. The revised treaty was signed at a ceremony in Paris on 23 October 1954. The conventions came into force during the last meeting of the Allied High Commission, that took place in the United States Embassy in Bonn, on 5 May 1955.

Overview

Attaining sovereignty had become necessary in light of the rearmament efforts of the FRG. For this reason, it was agreed that the Treaty would only come to force when West Germany also joined the European Defense Community (EDC). Because the EDC Treaty was not approved by France's Parliament on 30 August 1954, the General Treaty could not come into effect. After this failure, the EDC Treaty had to be reworked and the nations at the London Nine-Power Conference decided to allow West Germany to join NATO and to create the Western European Union (not to be confused with the Western Union or the European Union). With this development, West Germany, under the leadership of Konrad Adenauer, in front of the backdrop of the Cold War became a fully trusted partner of the western allies and with the second draft of the General Treaty, West Germany largely regained its sovereignty.  The Allies, however, retained some controls over Germany until 1991 (see further Two Plus Four Agreement). Also, the end of the occupation regime in West Germany technically did not extend to Berlin (indeed the continuation of the presence of the Western Allies in West Berlin was necessary and even desired by West Germany given the Cold War context), and the occupation of Berlin by the Allies was only finalized in 1994 under the terms of the Two Plus Four Treaty.

Settlement Convention 

Article 1 of Schedule I of the Settlement Convention provides that the Federal Republic of Germany is accorded "the full authority of a sovereign State over its internal and external affairs". However, Article 2 provides that the Three Powers retain their rights "relating to Berlin and to Germany as a whole, including the reunification of Germany and a peace settlement". Article 2 was designed to prevent acts undertaken by the Allies during the German occupation from being questioned retroactively by West German courts.

Miriam Aziz of The Robert Schumann Centre, of the European University Institute, makes the point that there is a difference between the wording of the Settlement Convention "the full authority of a sovereign State" and the wording in the Treaty on the Final Settlement with Respect to Germany of 1990 in which Germany is referred to as having "full sovereignty over its internal and external affairs", gives rise to a distinction between de facto and de jure sovereignty. Detlef Junker of the Ruprecht-Karls-Universität Heidelberg agrees with this analysis: "In the October 23, 1954, Paris Agreements, Adenauer pushed through the following laconic wording: 'The Federal Republic shall accordingly [after termination of the occupation regime] have the full authority of a sovereign state over its internal and external affairs.' If this was intended as a statement of fact, it must be conceded that it was partly fiction and, if interpreted as wishful thinking, it was a promise that went unfulfilled until 1990. The Allies maintained their rights and responsibilities regarding Berlin and Germany as a whole, particularly the responsibility for future reunification and a future peace treaty."

See also 
 Petersberg Protocol of November 1949. Signed between the three Allies and Konrad Adenauer, the first Chancellor of the Federal Republic of Germany.
 London and Paris Conferences
 Four Power Agreement on Berlin
 Two Plus Four Agreement (Treaty on the Final Settlement with Respect to Germany)

Footnotes

References 
 Miriam Aziz, (Robert Schumann Centre, European University Institute) Sovereignty Lost, Sovereignty Regained? Some Reflections on the Bundesverfassungsgericht’s Bananas Judgment(PDF) Constitutionalism Web-Papers, ConWEB No. 3/2003,

Further reading 
 Aziz, Miriam. 'The Impact of European Rights on National Legal Cultures' (Oxford: Hart Publishing, 2004)
 Declaration Regarding the Defeat of Germany and the Assumption of Supreme Authority by Allied Powers
 Approval by Western Military Governors: THE BONN CONSTITUTION (BASIC LAW FOR THE FEDERAL REPUBLIC OF GERMANY) 12 May 1949
 Joint Resolution To Terminate the State of War Between the United States and the Government of Germany Public Law 181, 82nd Congress, Approved 19 October 1951
 Ostpolitik: The Quadripartite Agreement 3 September 1971
 Press release issued by the Registrar on the judgement in Prince Hans-Adam II of Liechtenstein v. Germany (application number 42527/98) 12 July 2001 (the judgement)

1. Protocol 1. on the Termination of the Occupation Regime in the Federal Republic of Germany
2. Resume of the Five Schedules Attached to the Protocol on the Termination of the Occupation Regime
Declaration of the Federal Republic on Aid to Berlin
Convention on the presence of Foreign Forces in the Federal Republic of Germany
5. Three-Power Declaration on Berlin

 1. Declaration involving Italy and the Federal Republic of Germany to accede to the Brussels Treaty
 2. Protocol modifying and completing the Brussels Treaty
 Protocol No. II on Forces of Western European Union
 Protocol No. III on the Control of Armaments
 Protocol No. IV on the Agency of Western European Union for the Control of Armaments
 3. Letters with reference to the jurisdiction of the International Court of Justice from, respectively, the Governments of the Federal Republic and of Italy to the other Governments signatory of the Protocol Modifying and Completing the Brussels Treaty
  Reply to the Letters from the Governments of the Federal Republic and of Italy to the Other Governments Signatory of the Protocol Modifying and Completing  the Brussels Treaty
  4. Resolution on Production and Standardization of Armaments (Adopted by the Nine-Power Conference on 21 October 1954)

1 Resolution to Implement Section IV of the Final Act of the London Conference
2. Resolution of Association 
 Declaration by the Government of the Federal Republic of Germany 
Declaration by the Governments of United States of America, United Kingdom and France 
3. Protocol to the North Atlantic Treaty on the Accession of the Federal Republic of Germany
4 Resolution on Hesulis of the Four and Nine Power Meetings (Adopted by the North Atlantic Council on 22 October 1954)
Final Act of the London Conference (3 October)
Federal Chancellor's List – Declaration by the Powers 
British Statement 
Canadian Affirmation 
German Membership of NATO – Powers' Recommendation 
Principles of UN Charter – German Acceptance 
Declaration by the German Federal Republic
Declaration by the Governments of U.S.A., U.K. and France 
European Unity – Close Association of Britain 
Annex 1. Draft Declaration and Draft Protocol Inviting Italy and the German Federal Republic to Accede to the Brussels Treaty

Allied occupation of Germany
1952 in Germany
1952 in France
1955 in France
Treaties of the United Kingdom
Treaties of the United States
Treaties concluded in 1952
Treaties entered into force in 1955
Treaties of the French Fourth Republic
Treaties of West Germany
20th century in Bonn
1950s in North Rhine-Westphalia
1954 in Paris
May 1952 events in Europe